
Gmina Nidzica is an urban-rural gmina (administrative district) in Nidzica County, Warmian-Masurian Voivodeship, in northern Poland.

Villages
Apart from the town of Nidzica, Gmina Nidzica contains the villages and settlements of Bartoszki, Bolejny, Borowy Młyn, Brzeżno Łyńskie, Bujaki, Dobrzyń, Frąknowo, Grzegórzki, Jabłonka, Kalkownia, Kamionka, Kanigowo, Koniuszyn, Łączki, Leśne Pólko, Leśne Śliwki, Likusy, Litwinki, Łyna, Łyński Młyn, Łysakowo, Magdaleniec, Moczysko, Módłki, Mogiłowo, Napiwoda, Natać Mała, Natać Wielka, Nibork Drugi, Olszewko, Olszewo, Orłowo, Parowa, Pawliki, Piątki, Piotrowice, Rączki, Radomin, Robaczewo, Rozdroże, Siemiątki, Szerokopaś, Tatary, Wały, Waszulki, Waszulki-Kolonia, Wietrzychówko, Wietrzychowo, Wikno, Wolisko, Wólka Orłowska, Zagrzewo, Załuski, Żelazno and Zimna Woda.

Neighbouring gminas
Gmina Nidzica is bordered by the gminas of Janowiec Kościelny, Janowo, Jedwabno, Kozłowo and Olsztynek.

References
Polish official population figures 2006

Nidzica
Nidzica County